"Innocence" is episode 14 of season two of Buffy the Vampire Slayer. It was written and directed by Joss Whedon and first broadcast on January 20, 1998. It is part two of a two-part story. Part one, "Surprise". was broadcast the day before.

"Innocence" is one of the most critically acclaimed and highest rated episodes in the series, attracting 8.2 million viewers as the series moved from its Monday timeslot to Tuesday.

Plot
After making love with Buffy, Angel is racked with pain as his soul is ripped from him. In the street, he kills a passer-by when she offers to help him. He goes to the factory to join Spike and Drusilla, but the Judge attacks him. It is unable to burn him because Angel has fully reverted to the evil Angelus. Spike, Drusilla, and Angelus are clearly pleased to be reunited. Angelus vows to destroy Buffy for how she made him feel when he was Angel.

While researching a way to defeat the Judge, a demon with the power to destroy the world whom "no weapon forged" can harm, Xander and Cordelia are caught kissing in the library by a jealous Willow. Buffy finds Angel in his apartment, not knowing that he is now Angelus, and he blows her off, laughing at her as she weeps. Jenny is castigated by her uncle Enyos, who tells her that if Angel has one moment of true happiness, the curse placed on him will be broken and his new soul taken from him. Angelus terrorizes Willow and the Gang at school, emotionally tormenting Buffy. Later, as they discuss Angel's transformation in the library, Buffy realises that having sex with Angel is what caused him to turn evil.

Buffy has a dream in which Angel indicates that Jenny knows more than she is letting on. The next morning Buffy confronts Jenny who tells her that Angelus was cursed with a soul in vengeance for what he did to her people, and that Enyos had tasked her with keeping Buffy and Angel apart. When Buffy, Jenny, and Giles arrive at Enyos' home, they find that Angelus has brutally killed him, leaving Buffy a message written in blood on the wall. Buffy begins to accept that she has to kill Angelus.

Xander, using memories from being a soldier on Halloween, hatches a plan to kill the Judge. He and Cordelia break into an army base and steal a shoulder-launched rocket. Oz declines Willow's offer to make out, as he suspects that she only wants to make Xander jealous.

Tracking down the Judge, who is slaughtering people at a crowded mall, Buffy blows him to bits with the anti-tank weapon. Buffy stalks Angelus through the fleeing crowd and, when he ambushes her, they battle ferociously. Reaching a stand-off, Buffy is still unwilling to kill Angelus and settles for kicking him in the crotch.

Buffy blames herself for everything that has happened, but Giles reassures her that although she acted rashly, she and Angel loved each other and that Giles still supports and respects her. Later, Joyce lights the candle on Buffy's birthday cake and tells her to make a wish, but Buffy decides to let it burn, while they watch the classic movie Stowaway.

Broadcast and reception
"Innocence" was the highest rated episode ever for Buffy the Vampire Slayer, scoring a 5.2 Nielsen rating and a 6.7 overnight rating, with each ratings point representing 980,000 households. It was watched by 8.2 million viewers. The two-part story won an Emmy Award for Outstanding Makeup for a Series, one of only two Emmys the series would win.

In Entertainment Weekly list of the 25 best Whedonverse episodes—including episodes from Buffy, as well as Angel, Firefly and Dollhouse—"Innocence" placed at No. 2, with the magazine saying, "It's as primal a metaphor for the terrors of sex as one could imagine, and it showed the audience, the cast, and Whedon himself just how high his little show about dusting vampires could climb." Joss Whedon listed "Innocence" as his favorite episode of the series.

References

External links

 

Buffy the Vampire Slayer (season 2) episodes
1998 American television episodes
Television episodes written by Joss Whedon
Television episodes directed by Joss Whedon
Television episodes about mass murder